Upadhyaya Shri Guptisagarji is a Digambara monk who currently has the rank of an Upadhyaya. Born in 1957, he took ailak diksha under Acharya Vidyasagar ji in 1980,  Muni diksha in 1982 also under Acharya Vidyasagar. He was initiated an Upadhyaya by Acharya Vidyanand ji in 1991. He is the inspiration behind Gupti Dham Jain Mandir, Ganaur, Sonipat.

Biography
He officiated over the Mahamastakabhishek of Bhagwan Adinath at Bawangaja during January 26 – February 10, 2008.
He became the first Digambar Jain monk to visit Shimla, where he stayed at the 125-year-old Jain temple.

Guptisagar is a Digambara monk who has 30 publications and a Guinness World Record in his name for having inspired a dental exam involving 5,415 children at the same time.

References

Indian Jain monks
21st-century Indian Jains
21st-century Jain monks
21st-century Indian monks